Synthopsis iohannae is a species of minute sea snails, marine gastropod molluscs in the family Cerithiopsidae.

It was described by Cecalupo and Perugia in 2012.

References

 Cecalupo A. & Perugia I. (2013) The Cerithiopsidae (Caenogastropoda: Triphoroidea) of Espiritu Santo - Vanuatu (South Pacific Ocean). Published by the authors, Milano. 253 pp.

Gastropods described in 2012
Cerithiopsidae